Harry Ellis was a rugby union player.

Harry Ellis may also refer to:

Harry Ellis (athlete), participant in 2010 World Junior Championships in Athletics – Men's 1500 metres
Harry Ellis (cricketer) (1878–1943), New Zealand cricketer
Harry Ellis (golfer) (born 1995), English golfer
Harry Ellis, character in Die Hard

See also

Harold Ellis (disambiguation)
Henry Ellis (disambiguation)